Maine Question 3, formally An Act to Require Background Checks for Gun Sales, was a citizen-initiated referendum question that appeared on the Maine November 8, 2016 statewide ballot. It sought to require a background check for virtually all gun transfers in Maine, with some exceptions.  As the Maine Legislature and Governor Paul LePage declined to enact the proposal as written, it appeared on the ballot along with elections for President of the United States, Maine's two United States House seats, the Maine Legislature, other statewide ballot questions, and various local elections.

The question was defeated, with 51.8% of voters opposed.

Background
Efforts to expand background checks of gun buyers have not succeeded at the Maine State House.  In 2013, an effort to create a civil penalty of someone not conducting a background check on a buyer later found to not be allowed to possess a gun passed the Maine Legislature, but was vetoed by Governor Paul LePage, a strong gun rights supporter. An outright requirement to conduct background checks on gun buyers in private sales failed to pass the Legislature that same year.

On August 24, 2015, the group Maine Moms Demand Action (MMDA) filed paperwork with the Maine Secretary of State's office to launch a petition drive to require virtually all gun sales to have a background check of the buyer conducted by a licensed gun dealer.  The proposal includes exceptions for transfers between family members, temporary loans of firearms while hunting or sport shooting, an emergency need for self-defense, and other limited exceptions.

MMDA submitted the 84,600 signatures they gathered on January 19, 2016.  The Secretary of State's office announced on February 18 that 65,821 signatures were validated, well over the 61,123 required to place a question on the ballot. The question will appear on the ballot as "Do you want to require background checks prior to the sale or transfer of firearms between individuals not licensed as firearms dealers, with failure to do so punishable by law, and with some exceptions for family members, hunting, self-defense, lawful competitions, and shooting range activity?"

Campaign
Gun rights supporters criticized the proposal.  The Sportsman's Alliance of Maine's executive director, David Trahan, stated that while background checks sound good in theory, they are difficult to implement and enforce, which is why there has been no national universal background check system.  He also criticized the potential involvement of Michael Bloomberg and other out-of-state gun control groups spending large amounts of money in Maine.  State Senator Eric Brakey criticized the effort as a back-door attempt to establish a gun registry.

Supporters officially launched their campaign on May 14, 2016, calling themselves Mainers for Responsible Gun Ownership. The group includes law enforcement officials, gun violence survivors, sportsmen, gun owners and gun violence prevention advocates.  They state that background checks will close a loophole in existing gun laws which allow criminals, domestic abusers, and the mentally ill to obtain guns without a background check by not going to a licensed dealer. They also claim that states with expansive background checks experience lower rates of women being shot to death by their intimate partners, as well as lower rates of police officers being killed by handguns.

Governor Paul LePage, in expressing opposition to the referendum, called it unconstitutional.  Referendum supporters cite a 2007 decision written by U.S. Supreme Court Justice Antonin Scalia stating that background checks are constitutional.

The Maine Warden Service, while not officially opposing the referendum, expressed concern that its passage "could make criminals out of responsible firearm owners" and that it would be difficult to enforce.

Notable endorsements

Supporters
Maine Moms Demand Action
Sean Geagan, chief, Bucksport Police Department  
Bucky Owen, former commissioner, Department of Inland Fisheries and Wildlife
Bill Vail, former commissioner, Department of Inland Fisheries and Wildlife
Michael Gahagan, chief, Caribou Police Department
Bangor Daily News 
Equality Maine
Maine Chiefs of Police Association
Ellsworth American
Maine Women's Lobby
MaineToday Media newspapers; Portland Press Herald, Kennebec Journal, Morning Sentinel
USA Today
The Times Record, newspaper of Brunswick

Opponents
Eric Brakey, Republican State Senator 
Darrell Crandall, Aroostook County Sheriff
Barry Curtis, Washington County Sheriff
Donna Dennison, Knox County Sheriff
Wayne Gallant, Oxford County Sheriff
John Goggin, Piscataquis County Sheriff
Scott Kane, Hancock County Sheriff
William King, York County Sheriff
Dale Lancaster, Somerset County Sheriff
Paul LePage, Governor of Maine
Jeff McCabe, Majority Leader of the Maine House of Representatives
Troy Morton, Penobscot County Sheriff
Scott Nichols, Franklin County Sheriff
Eric Samson, Androscoggin County Sheriff
Jeffery Trafton, Waldo County Sheriff
Gun Owners of Maine
Sportsmen's Alliance of Maine
National Rifle Association

Polling

Results

References

External links
Mainers for Responsible Gun Ownership, supporters of the referendum
Sportsman's Alliance of Maine, a group opposed to the referendum

United States firearms law
2016 Maine ballot measures